Guru Nanak (1469 – 1539) was the founder of Sikhism, and the first of the ten Sikh gurus.

Guru Nanak may refer to:
 Guru Nanak College, Budhlada
 Guru Nanak Darbar Gurdwara, in Gravesend, UK
 Guru Nanak Khalsa College of Arts, Science & Commerce, India
 Guru Nanak Gurdwara Smethwick, in Smethwick
 Guru Nanak Jhira Sahib, a Sikh historical shrine situated in Bidar, Karnataka, 1948, a Bruneian government ministry
 Guru Nanak Stadium, a football stadium in Ludhiana, India
 Guru Nanak Gurpurab, also known as Guru Nanak's Prakash Utsav and Guru Nanak Jayanti, which celebrates the birth of the first Sikh Guru
 Baba Guru Nanak University, an international university to be located in Nankana Sahib, Punjab, Pakistan, the birthplace of Guru Nanak, whose groundbreaking would commence by 2016

See also 
 Guru Nanak Dev (disambiguation)